Atos Jiu-Jitsu is a Brazilian jiu-jitsu academy and team started in 2008 by Ramon Lemos and Andre Galvão with its current headquarters in San Diego, California. Atos is one of the most dominant teams in BJJ's competition.

History 
In October 2008, after the decline of Brasa Academy, the Brazilian jiu-jitsu team to which they both belonged, Ramon Lemos and André Galvão decided to form a competition team with a strong moral foundation based on their Christian faith. Atos Jiu-Jitsu was established in Rio Claro, São Paulo, Brazil before moving to California in 2010. The team led by multi-time world champion (Gi and No-Gi) ADCC & IBJJF Hall Of Fame Member Galvão, quickly grew into one of the strongest teams in Jiu-Jitsu & Submission Grappling, winning quickly after its establishment 5 black belt World Jiu-Jitsu Championships and producing multiple champion athletes over the years. 
Atos Jiu-jitsu schools are present in over 20 countries worldwide.

Notable members
The first black belts to be promoted by Atos were brothers Rafael & Guilherme Mendes in 2008.

A list of notable current and former members:
 Rafael Mendes
 Guilherme Mendes (first Atos black belt world champion)
 Mike Fowler
 Claudio Calasans
 Gilbert Burns
 Lucas Barbosa
 Davi Ramos
 Jonathan Torres 
 Tye Ruotolo
 Kade Ruotolo
 Josh Hinger 
 Keenan Cornelius
 Kaynan Duarte
 Luiza Monteiro
 Ffion Davies
 Anderson Silva
 Israel Adesanya
 Carlos Diego
 Cat Zingano
 Cris Cyborg

See also
 Brazilian Jiu-Jitsu
 Grappling

Notes

References 

Brazilian jiu-jitsu organizations